The  were two dreadnoughts ordered as part of the "Eight-Eight" fleet for the Imperial Japanese Navy (IJN) during the early 1920s. The ships were larger versions of the preceding , and carried an additional  twin-gun turret. The design for the class served as a basis for the s.

Both ships were launched in late 1921, but the first ship, was cancelled in accordance with the terms of the Washington Naval Treaty before it could be completed, and was used in experiments testing the effectiveness of its armor scheme before being scuttled in the Bungo Channel. The hull of the second ship, was converted into an aircraft carrier of the same name. The carrier supported Japanese troops in China during the Second Sino-Japanese War of the late 1930s, and took part in the attack on Pearl Harbor on 7 December 1941 and the invasion of Rabaul in the Southwest Pacific in January 1942. The following month her aircraft participated in a combined carrier airstrike on Darwin, Australia, during the Dutch East Indies campaign. She was sunk during the Battle of Midway in 1942.

Background 

The IJN believed that a modern battle fleet of eight battleships and eight armored cruisers was necessary for the defense of Japan; the government ratified that idea in 1907. This policy was the genesis of the Eight-Eight Fleet Program, the development of a cohesive battle line of sixteen capital ships less than eight years old. Advances in naval technology represented by the British battleship  and the battlecruiser  forced the IJN to reevaluate on several occasions which ships it considered "modern" and, in 1911, it restarted the program with orders for the  super dreadnoughts and the s. By 1915, the IJN was halfway to its goal and wanted to order four more super dreadnoughts, but the Diet rejected the plan and authorized only the dreadnought  and two battlecruisers in the 1916 budget. Later that year American President Woodrow Wilson announced plans for ten additional battleships and six battlecruisers, and the Diet authorized three more dreadnoughts in response the following year: a second ——and two to a modified design, Tosa and Kaga.

Design and description 
The IJN began reevaluating the Nagato design in light of lessons learned from the Battle of Jutland in May 1916, experiments evaluating armor protection, and newly acquired information on the protective schemes of British and American capital ships. These lessons highlighted the need for better protection of the main gun turrets and magazines, as well as thicker deck armor to protect against plunging fire. Existing methods of defense against mines and torpedoes had also proved to be inadequate and needed improvement. Eleven new designs were rejected between October and early 1917 before Captain Yuzuru Hiraga, superintendent of shipbuilding and the naval architect in charge of the fundamental design of the ships of the Eight-Eight Fleet, presented a heavily modified version of the Nagato design, A-125, to be built in lieu of the second ship of the class, Mutsu, on 12 June 1917, well before she was actually laid down.

Hiraga's design for the ship reflected the latest combat experience as well as incorporating advances in boiler technology. It added an extra twin main-gun turret, using space and weight made available by the reduction of the number of boilers from 21 to 12 while the power remained the same. He reduced the secondary armament from 20 guns to 16; they were moved up a deck to improve their arcs of fire and their ability to shoot during heavy weather. To increase the ship's protection he proposed to angle the belt armor outwards to improve its resistance to horizontal fire, and to thicken the lower deck armor and the torpedo bulkhead. Hiraga also planned to add anti-torpedo bulges to improve the ship's underwater protection. He estimated that his ship would displace as much as Nagato, although it would cost about a million yen more. These changes would have considerably delayed the ship's completion and were rejected by the Navy Ministry. The rejected design formed the basis for a much larger  battleship, designated as A-127, with nearly twice as much armor weight as the Nagatos. It was designed to achieve the same speed as the older ships, to allow them to maneuver together as a tactical formation. This design was accepted on 27 March 1918 and became the Tosa class.

More conventional Curtis geared steam turbines were chosen, powered by 12 Kampon water-tube boilers, eight of which would have used fuel oil and four of which would have used a mixture of oil and coal.

Armament 

The Tosa-class ships were intended to be armed with a main battery of ten 45-caliber 41-centimeter (16.1-inch) guns in five twin turrets, four of which were superfiring fore and aft. Numbered one through five from front to rear, the hydraulically powered turrets had an elevation range of −2 to +35 degrees. The rate of fire for the guns was around two rounds per minute. The ships were designed to carry 90 rounds per gun, although space was available for 110.

The guns used Type 91 armor-piercing, capped shells.

The ships' secondary armament of twenty 50-caliber 3rd Year Type 14-centimeter (5.5-inch) guns would have been mounted in casemates, 12 on the upper sides of the hull and eight in the superstructure. Anti-aircraft defense was provided by four 40-caliber 3rd Year Type 8-centimeter AA guns in single mounts. The guns were normally supplied with 250 rounds each, although space was available for a total of 400 rounds per gun. These 3rd Year Type guns were intended to be replaced by four 45-caliber  anti-aircraft guns.

The Tosas were intended to mount eight  torpedo tubes, four above water and four below. The former were to be provided with two torpedoes each and the latter with three each.

Armor 
They would have been protected by a waterline main belt of Vickers cemented armor that sloped outwards 15 degrees at the top. Approximately  of the armor belt was below the waterline.

The middle deck was the primary armored deck and was connected to the top of the armor belt. It would have consisted of a  plate of New Vickers non-cemented armor on top of a  plate of high-tensile steel (HTS) above the engine and boiler rooms. Above the magazines, the thickness of the HTS plate would have increased to 63 mm. The lower deck would have consisted of two  plates of HTS. For the first time in a Japanese ship, the Tosas would have had the lower portion of the single funnel protected by 229 mm of armor. In addition, the funnel openings in the lower deck would have been protected by armor gratings.

The ships would have had an internal torpedo bulge to provide protection against underwater explosions. This was backed by a torpedo bulkhead also made up of three  layers of HTS and angled outwards to meet the base of the waterline belt. It connected to a  splinter bulkhead on the lower deck behind the waterline belt. Behind the torpedo bulge and the splinter bulkhead was another splinter bulkhead 12.7–19 mm thick.

Ships

Cancellation and fates 

Construction of both ships began in 1920, but the 1922 Washington Naval Treaty intervened, mandating the cancellation of all capital ships being built. Work stopped on the two Tosa-class battleships on 5 February 1922. After being stricken on 1 April 1924, Tosas guns were turned over to the Imperial Japanese Army for use as coastal artillery; two of her main-gun turrets were installed on Tsushima Island and near Busan, Korea. The rest of her guns were placed in reserve and ultimately scrapped in 1943. Tosas incomplete hull was used to test her armor scheme against long-range naval gunfire, aerial bombs, mines, and torpedoes. Two of the shells fired at her fell short, but deeply penetrated her hull through the thin armor of the torpedo bulge below the waterline armor belt. This sparked an interest in optimizing underwater performance of Japanese shells that culminated in production of the Type 91 armor-piercing shell. Conversely, the IJN took measures to defend against shells of this type when reconstructing its existing battleships during the 1930s, as well as in the designs of the s and the heavy cruisers of the Mogami and es. Tosas torpedo defense system proved able to defeat  torpedo warheads, but not larger  ones.

The battlecruiser , which was being converted to an aircraft carrier under the terms of the treaty, was wrecked in the Great Kantō earthquake in 1923 and rendered unusable. As a result, Kaga, which was originally slated to be scrapped under the terms of the Washington Naval Treaty (Chapter I, Article IX), was converted in Amagis stead. No work took place until 1925 as new plans were drafted and earthquake damage to the Yokosuka Naval Arsenal was repaired. Although the ship was commissioned on 31 March 1928, she did not join the Combined Fleet (Rengō Kantai) until 30 November 1929.

Much like the converted  , Kaga was fitted with two flying-off decks "stepped down" from a flight deck that extended two-thirds of the ship; in theory, this allowed planes to take off directly from the hangars while other planes landed on the top. As aircraft became heavier during the 1930s, they required longer distances to get airborne and the lower flight decks became useless. Kagas 1935 reconstruction removed the lower two decks and extended the top flight deck to the bow. As completed, the ship had two main hangar decks and a third auxiliary hangar with a total capacity of 60 aircraft.

Kaga was provided with a heavy gun armament in case she was surprised by enemy cruisers and forced to give battle, but her large and vulnerable flight deck, hangars, and other features made her more of a target in any surface action than a fighting warship. Carrier doctrine was still evolving at this time and the impracticability of carriers engaging in gun duels had not yet been realized. The ship was armed with ten 20 cm/50 3rd Year Type guns: one twin-gun turret on each side of the middle flight deck and six in casemates aft.

In 1933–35 Kaga was rebuilt to increase her top speed, improve her exhaust systems, and adapt her flight decks to more modern, heavier aircraft. The ten  guns, although now all mounted singly in casemates, were retained.

Kagas aircraft first supported Japanese troops in China during the Shanghai Incident of 1932 and participated in the Second Sino-Japanese War in the late 1930s. With five other fleet carriers, she took part in the Pearl Harbor raid in December 1941 and the invasion of Rabaul in the Southwest Pacific in January 1942. The following month her aircraft participated in a combined carrier airstrike on Darwin, Australia, helping secure the conquest of the Dutch East Indies by Japanese forces. She missed the Indian Ocean raid in April as she had to return to Japan for repairs after hitting a reef in February. Following repairs, Kaga rejoined the 1st Air Fleet for the attack on Midway Atoll in June 1942.

Notes

Footnotes

References 
 
 
 
 
 
 
   (contact the editor at lars.ahlberghalmstad.mail.postnet.se for subscription information)

Further reading

External links 

 Haze Gray & Underway page on Japanese dreadnought and semi-dreadnought battleships

Battleship classes